This is a list of notable Jewish American linguists. For other Jewish Americans, see Lists of Jewish Americans.

 Noam Chomsky, linguist and political philosopher
 Cyrus Gordon. Semiticist, held ancient Crete Minoan was Northwest Semitic
 Joseph Greenberg, language classification, created a unified classification of African languages 
 Roman Jakobson, one of the founders of modern phonology (converted to Orthodox Christianity in 1975)
 Jay Jasanoff, Indo-European linguist
 Samuel Noah Kramer, Sumerologist, known as the "father of Assyriology and Sumerology"
 William Labov, sociolinguist, awarded the Neil and Saras Smith Medal for Linguistics by the British Academy (2015)
 María Rosa Lida de Malkiel, Spanish philologist
 Yakov Malkiel, Romance philologist
 Isaac Nordheimer, Hebrew and Syriac scholar and philologist
 Edward Sapir, anthropologist-linguist, founder of enthnolinguistics
 Dan I. Slobin, (psycho)linguist, studies linguistics and acquisition of signed languages of the deaf
 Deborah Tannen, sociolinguist with a focus on gender linguistics

References

Jewish
Linguists